Marcus Nilsson (born 3 May 1991 in Malmö) is a Swedish decathlete. He competed at the 2013 World Championships in Moscow, Russia.

Nilsson hails from Kalmar in the flat southern Sweden. He grew up in a sports family where both his father Carl-Gustaf ”Calle” and mother Katarina competed at an elite level. His brother David and two sisters, Ida and Johanna, have belonged to the Swedish national team in athletics. At the 2002 Swedish cross country championships the family walked home with four gold medals, one silver and one bronze.

Competition record

References

External links 
 Marcus Nilsson at UCLA Bruins
 

1991 births
Living people
Swedish decathletes
Sportspeople from Malmö